Acrorhizodus is an extinct genus of hybodont shark currently containing only the species: Acrorhizodus khoratensis. It is known from the Albian to Aptian aged Khok Kruat formation of the Khok Pha Suam locality near the town of Sri Muang Mai, Thailand. It displays a mix of features which sets it apart from all hybodont families currently known.

References

Hybodontiformes
Prehistoric shark genera